is an arcade game developed and published by Namco in 1998, and released on the arcade system board Namco System 23 in dedicated cabinets with 33" or 50" monitors.

Gameplay
The game's unique controls are two horizontally moving levers, one for each player. Both levers move in an arc across the front of the game, but will collide when they are close together. The levers cause players to physically push each other aside as they direct their characters to collide on-screen, literally impeding each other's progress.

Reception

In Japan, Game Machine listed Panic Park in their July 1, 1998 issue as being the third most popular arcade game at the time.

Notes

References

External links

1998 video games
Arcade video games
Arcade-only video games
Head-to-head arcade video games
Minigame compilations
Namco arcade games
Party video games
Video games developed in Japan